Vogue Australia is the Australian edition of Vogue magazine. Vogue Australia became the 4th edition of Vogue in 1959 after Vogue, British Vogue and Vogue Paris. Prior to becoming a stand-alone issue, the Australian edition was a supplement in British Vogue from 1952. Australian Vogue occasionally has supplements: Vogue Business Australia, Vogue Man Australia, and Vogue Fashion Week Australia. In Australia, Vogue Living was first published in 1967. Vogue Australia celebrated its 60th anniversary issue in December 2019 with Edward Enninful and British Vogue.

Features

Indigenous Australian representation
Elaine George became the first Indigenous Australian model to feature on the cover of any edition of Vogue with her September 1993 Vogue Australia cover. Regarding her historic cover, George stated "I wanted to make sure I represented my people in the best way […] it was like bringing the rest of Australia on a journey. I had that opportunity to make way for the next young Aboriginal model". In June 2010, 17 years after George, Dunghutti model Samantha Harris became the second Indigenous Australian model to feature on the cover of Vogue Australia. This was followed by Awabakal model Charlee Frasers' cover in April 2018.

Vogue Australia has featured the work of Indigenous artists and designers. The 60th Anniversary issue in December 2019 featured Yolngu model Maminydjama (Magnolia) Maymuru and artist Maree Clarke, among others. 

On the theme of "hope", for the September 2020 cover, during the COVID-19 pandemic in Australia, Vogue Australia worked with the National Gallery of Australia to commission artist Betty Muffler, an Aṉangu Pitjantjatjara woman and Ngangkaṟi (spiritual healer) from remote South Australia, to bring hope and healing with her artwork Ngangkari Ngura (Healing Country). Of the cover, Muffler said, "Through my paintings you can see my Ngangkari work: watching over people and also looking after Country. My Country. This place is very important – we all need to look after each other and respect our home".

Healthy body initiative 
May 2013 marked the first anniversary of a healthy body initiative that was signed by the magazine's international editors—the initiative represents a commitment from the editors to promote positive body images within the content of Vogue's numerous editions. Vogue Australia editor Edwina McCann explained:In the magazine we're moving away from those very young, very thin girls. A year down the track, we ask ourselves what can Vogue do about it? And an issue like this [June 2013 issue] is what we can do about it. If I was aware of a girl being ill on a photo shoot I wouldn't allow that shoot to go ahead, or if a girl had an eating disorder I would not shoot her.The Australian edition's June 2013 issue was entitled Vogue Australia: "The Body Issue" and featured articles on exercise and nutrition, as well as a diverse range of models. New York-based Australian plus-size model Robyn Lawley, previously featured on the cover of Vogue Italia, also appeared in a swimwear shoot for the June issue.

Jonathan Newhouse, Condé Nast International chairman, stated that "Vogue editors around the world want the magazines to reflect their commitment to the health of the models who appear on the pages and the wellbeing of their readers." Alexandra Shulman, one of the magazine's editors, commented on the initiative by stating, "As one of the fashion industry's most powerful voices, Vogue has a unique opportunity to engage with relevant issues where we feel we can make a difference."

See also
 List of Vogue Australia cover models

References

External links

Women's magazines published in Australia
Condé Nast magazines
Magazines established in 1959
English-language magazines
1959 establishments in Australia
Monthly magazines published in Australia
Vogue (magazine)
Magazines published in Sydney